An Ikoro is a musical instrument created and used by the Igbo of Nigeria. It is a slit drum that is beaten with a stick or sticks and can be used in some parts of Igbo land for communicating, similar to a talking drum. Ikoro in Igbo land is not beaten by everybody. It is so special that any time its sound is heard people will gather at the village square. As soon as it sounds, people around assume that any of the following has happened: murder, land has been defiled, there is outbreak of war, a calamity has befallen the community etc. The inevitable thing that happens any time the Ikoro sound is heard is that people must gather at the village square to hear the latest development. Ikoro also brings a sense of urgency. The only difference between Ikoro and Ekwe is the size. Ekwe is small in size and portable while Ikoro is enormous in size, cannot be carried by one person and is never carried from place to place. Ikoro is kept in a fixed place usually at the village square. Ekwe is an ordinary musical instrument and is used to play many types of traditional music.

External links
 

Drums
Slit drums
African drums
Igbo musical instruments
Idiophones struck directly